Otjinene Constituency is an electoral constituency in the Omaheke Region of Namibia. It had 7,400 inhabitants in 2011 and 5,619 registered voters . Its district capital is the village of Otjinene.

Villages and settlements in Otjinene Constituency include: Otjiuaneho, Ehungiro, Okahungu, Goreses, Otjikova, Okorukurure, Otura, Ovijapa, Okomumbonde, Omungondo, Erindiroukambe, Okauua, Okonya, Okazapamba, Otjiuetjombungu, Okaoveni, Okatjana, Ozonduno, Epata, Erindiotjirarua, Okavangua, Ombujanjama, Otjipandjarua, Oukango, Otjimanahakane, Okate, Otjovengi, Otjipandjarua, Otjinoko, Okanokona, Ozondjou, Okarui, Ondiripumua, Otjikorondo, Orunarongue, Okawarongo, Okamuina, Ozongaru, Ozombeto, Ourundu, Ondorozu, Ovizuzu, Otjiteke.

Politics
Otjinene is one of the few Namibian constituencies that are not dominated by the SWAPO Party. The 2015 regional election was won by Erwin Katjizeu of the National Unity Democratic Organisation (NUDO) with 1,529 votes, followed by Nono Katjingisiua (SWAPO) with 965 votes. Albert Kandjii of the Democratic Turnhalle Alliance (DTA) finished third with 261 votes, followed by Issaskar Hiakaere of the South West Africa National Union (SWANU) with 78 votes. Councillor Katjizeu (NUDO) was reelected in the 2020 regional election, winning with 1,650 votes. Edmund Meroro (SWAPO) came second with 390 votes, followed by Dave Ndjavera of the Popular Democratic Movement (PDM, the new name of the DTA) with 381 votes.

References

Constituencies of Omaheke Region
States and territories established in 1992
1992 establishments in Namibia